The Great Western Railway Sun Class 2-2-2 broad gauge steam locomotives for passenger train work. This class was introduced into service between April 1840 and January 1842, and withdrawn between January 1864 and June 1879.

A smaller-wheeled version of the Fire Fly Class for working trains on the hilly sections of line west of Swindon, they did not prove heavy enough for the task and were later altered to become 2-2-2T tank locomotives. Later still Sun, Hesperus, Gazelle, Wolf, and Assagais were given higher pressure boilers and in this form ran until 1879; the last unrebuilt locomotive having been withdrawn in 1872.

From about 1865, the Sun Class was known as the Wolf Class.

Locomotives
 Antelope (1841 - 1870)
Built by Sharp, Roberts and Company, this locomotive was named after a fast animal, an antelope. It worked the first train from Teignmouth to Newton on the South Devon Railway on 30 December 1846.
 Assagais (1841 - 1875)
Built by Stothert and Slaughter, this locomotive was named after an African spear
 Aurora (1840 - 1866)
 Comet (1840 - 1871)
 Creese (1842 - 1866)
Built by Stothert and Slaughter, this locomotive was named after the Kris, a short wavy dagger. 
 Djerid (1841 - 1870)
Built by Stothert and Slaughter, this locomotive was named after a throwing spear, the djerid 
 Eclipse (1840 - 1864)
Built by R and W Hawthorn and Company.
 Gazelle (1841 - 1879)
Built by Sharp, Roberts and Company, this locomotive was named after  the swift animal, gazelle.
 Giraffe (1841 - 1872)
Built by Sharp, Roberts and Company, this locomotive was named after  the swift animal, giraffe.
 Hesperus (1841 - 1876)
It was named after Hesperus a character in Roman mythology.
 Javelin (1841 - 1870)
Built by Stothert and Slaughter, this locomotive was named after a thrown weapon, a javelin. 
 Lance (1841 - 1870)
Built by Stothert and Slaughter, the name is that of a thrown weapon, a lance.
 Meridian (1840 - 1870)
Built by R and W Hawthorn and Company.
 Meteor (1840 - 1864)
Built by R and W Hawthorn and Company, this locomotive was named after a fast moving heavenly body, a Meteor.
 Rocket (1841 - 1870)
Built by Stothert and Slaughter, this locomotive was named after a swift projectile, a rocket
 Stiletto (1841 - 1870)
Built by Stothert and Slaughter.
 Sun (1840 - 1873)
Built by R and W Hawthorn and Company, this locomotive was named after the Sun.
 Sunbeam (1840 - 1870)
Built by R and W Hawthorn and Company.
 Wolf (1841 - 1873)
Built by Sharp, Roberts and Company, this locomotive was named after the strong animal, wolf.
 Yataghan (1841 - 1871)
Built by Stothert and Slaughter.
 Zebra (1841 - 1871)
Built by Sharp, Roberts and Company, this locomotive was named after the fast animal, the zebra.

References

 
 
 

Sun
2-2-2 locomotives
Broad gauge (7 feet) railway locomotives
Sharp Stewart locomotives
Avonside locomotives
Hawthorn locomotives
Railway locomotives introduced in 1840
Scrapped locomotives
Passenger locomotives